Tomasz Szczypiński (born 22 September 1953 in Kraków) is a Polish politician. He was elected to the Sejm on 25 September 2005, getting 7399 votes in 13 Kraków district as a candidate from the Civic Platform list.

He was also a member of Sejm 2001-2005.

See also
Members of Polish Sejm 2005-2007

External links
Tomasz Szczypiński - parliamentary page - includes declarations of interest, voting record, and transcripts of speeches.

Members of the Polish Sejm 2005–2007
Members of the Polish Sejm 2001–2005
Civic Platform politicians
1953 births
Living people